The 1997 Brabantse Pijl was the 37th edition of the Brabantse Pijl cycle race and was held on 30 March 1997. The race started and finished in Alsemberg. The race was won by Gianluca Pianegonda.

General classification

References

1997
Brabantse Pijl